Nirdoshi or Niraparadhi is a 1951 Telugu/Tamil film produced and directed by H. M. Reddy. Mukkamala Krishna Murthy played role of hero whereas Anjali Devi played double role.  The Rai Brothers (P. L. Rai and Viswanatha Rai) worked as Cinematographers behind the camera and Ghantasala as Music director. Edited by M.S. Parthasarathy

Cast 
 Mukkamala Krishna Murthy as Vijay
 Anjali Devi as Nirmala
 G. Varalakshmi as Tara
 Kona Prabhakara Rao
 Lakshmikantam
 Tadepalli Lakshmi Kanta Rao
 Kaikala Satyanarayana
 Doraiswamy
 Chandrashekhar
 Madhu
 Pandit Rao

Production
As Mukkamala Krishna Murthy could not speak Tamil, Director H. M. Reddy appointed Sivaji Ganesan as a dubbing artiste. Sivaji Ganesan was a stage actor and not much known at that time.

Edited by M.S. Parthasarathy. Kona Prabhakara Rao has subsequently entered politics and rose to the level of minister and Governor in India.

Songs

Telugu

Tamil
Music was composed by Ghantasala and Padmanabha Sastri while the lyrics were penned by M. S. Subramaniam. Playback singers are: A. V. Saraswathi, G. Varalakshmi, A. P. Komala, Ghantasala, Sundaramma, Jikki, M. S. Subramaniam and M. S. Rama Rao.

Reception
Film historian Randor Guy wrote in 2008 that the film is "Remembered for the impressive performance of Anjali Devi in a difficult double role and the arresting screen presence of G. Varalakshmi."

References

External links
 
 

1951 films
Indian black-and-white films
Films scored by Ghantasala (musician)
1950s Telugu-language films
Indian multilingual films
1950s Tamil-language films
Films directed by H. M. Reddy
1950s multilingual films